The Nippon Club of South Africa (Nan A Nihonjihkai) was founded in 1961  as a social club for Japanese nationals in the Johannesburg area.

The Nippon Club is the only Japanese social club in South Africa.  The club's dual purpose is to help enhance the unity of the Japanese South African community and to help develop evolving relationships with the South African people.  The Nippon Club has fostered ongoing business and cultural relationships through various events.

Notes

References
 Morikawa Jun. (1997).  Japan and Africa: big business and diplomacy.Africa World Press. 

Organisations based in Johannesburg
Japanese South African
Japan–South Africa relations